Louis "Loulou" Gasté (18 March 1908 – 8 January 1995) was a French composer of songs.

Life
Louis Gasté was born in Paris in 1908. In his fifty-year career, he composed approximately 1,200 songs, ten of which were internationally successful. In 1929, he played in Ray Ventura's orchestra, and composed several pieces for him. He discovered and launched French singer and actress Line Renaud in 1945, and they married in 1950.

He died at Rueil-Malmaison in 1995.

"Pour Toi" / "Feelings" / "Dis-Lui" dispute 

In September 1956, Gasté composed "Pour Toi" ("For you") with lyrics by Albert Simonin and his wife Marie-Hélène Bourquin, for the singer Darío Moreno, who sang it in the film Le Feu aux Poudres. It was sung later by Line Renaud, and was reinterpreted in France and internationally by various singers.

In 1974, Morris Albert sang it in English and was credited as the original author of "Feelings", launched in São Paulo by Augusta Do Brazil. In 1975, Mike Brant brought it back to France under the title "Dis-Lui" ("Tell her").

In 1976, "Feelings" was a worldwide success and was recorded by Elvis Presley, Frank Sinatra and others.

In 1977, Gasté discovered the song was one of his melodies and sued Morris Albert. On 22 December 1988, a court found in favour of Gasté, and he won recognition as the sole creator of the song, gaining seven-eighths of all royalties, with Albert receiving the remainder for his lyrics contribution.

Selected compositions 

 1941: Avec son Ukulélé (for Jacques Pills)
 1941: Le Chant du Gardian (for Tino Rossi)
 1943: Elle Etait Swing (for Jacques Pills)
 1943: L’âme au Diable (for Léo Marjane)
 1943: Sainte-Madeleine (for Léo Marjane)
 1944: Domingo (for Lucienne Delyle)
 1945: Le Petit Chaperon Rouge ( for Lisette Jambel)
 1945: Quand un Cow-boy (for Georges Guétary)
 1945: Le Rythme Américain (for Lily Fayol)
 1945: Ce n’était pas Original ( for Jacqueline François)
 1945: Le Porte Bonheur, Chica Chica ( for Jacques Hélian)
 1945: Un Oiseau Chante ( for Gisèle Pascal)
 1945: Luna Park ( for Yves Montand)
 1945: Battling Jo (for Yves Montand)
 1947: Au Chili (for Jacques Hélian)
 1958: Mon Coeur au Portugal (recorded by several artists)

He also composed several songs for Line Renaud, including "Nous Deux", "Le Complet Gris", "Si J’avais la Chance", "Autant en Emporte le Vent", and "Ma cabane au Canada", which won the "Grand Prix du Disque" from Académy Charles Cros in 1949.

Selected filmography
 The Island of Love (1944)
 We Are Not Married (1946)
 The Porter from Maxim's (1953)
 Madelon (1955)
 Burning Fuse (1957)
 Mademoiselle and Her Gang (1957)
 The Indestructible (1959)

See also 
 Bébés à gogo (film 1956)

Notes

French male composers
Musicians from Paris
1908 births
1995 deaths
Burials at Passy Cemetery
20th-century French composers
Chevaliers of the Légion d'honneur
Officiers of the Ordre des Arts et des Lettres
Chevaliers of the Ordre des Palmes Académiques
20th-century French male musicians